Group G of the women's football tournament at the 2020 Summer Olympics was played from 21 to 27 July 2021 and included Australia, New Zealand, Sweden and the United States. The top two teams, Sweden and the United States, advanced to the knockout stage, along with third-placed Australia as one of the two best third-placed teams among all three groups.

Teams

Notes

Standings

In the quarter-finals,
The winner of Group G, Sweden, advanced to play the third-placed team of Group E, Japan.
The runner-up of Group G, the United States, advanced to play the winner of Group F, the Netherlands.
The third-placed team of Group G, Australia, advanced as one of the two best third-placed teams to play the winner of Group E, Great Britain.

Matches

Sweden vs United States

Australia vs New Zealand

Sweden vs Australia

New Zealand vs United States

New Zealand vs Sweden

United States vs Australia

Discipline
Fair play points would have been used as a tiebreaker if the overall and head-to-head records of teams were tied. These were calculated based on yellow and red cards received in all group matches as follows:
first yellow card: minus 1 point;
indirect red card (second yellow card): minus 3 points;
direct red card: minus 4 points;
yellow card and direct red card: minus 5 points;

Only one of the above deductions is applied to a player in a single match.

References

External links
Women's Olympic Football Tournament Tokyo 2020, FIFA.com

Group G